Intimamente: En Vivo Live (Eng.: Intimately: Live) is the title of a live album released by Regional Mexican band Intocable. This album became their fourth number-one set on the Billboard Top Latin Albums. It was released with two formats, CD and CD/DVD, and won the Grammy Award for Best Mexican/Mexican-American Album.

Track listing
The track listing from Billboard.com

CD track listing

DVD track listing
The track listing from Allmusic.

Credits
The information from Allmusic.
René Martínez — Producer, executive producer
Ricky Muñoz — Producer, executive producer
Jack Saenz — Mastering, mixing, digital imaging
Miguel Trujillo — Executive Producer
Roger Bresnahan — Executive producer
Gerard Bustos — Recording assistant
Oscar Carrasco — Executive producer
Gibby Cevallos — Executive producer
Bryan Bankovich — Technical director
Tom Zimmerman — Audio Supervisor
James Bulka — Engineer
Mickey Cevallos — Director, executive producer, photography
Elmer Flores — Camera operator
Bradley Fox — Producer
David Freidman — Photography director
Gretta Gamez — Mastering, mixing
Tomas Garcia — Coordination
Nelson Gonzalez — Art direction
Malcolm Harper — Engineer, recording
Héctor H kron  —  Post production Supervisor-Editor
Intocable — Arranger
Israel Juarbe — Editing, camera operator
Matt Nichols — Assistant art director
Paul Olivarri — Art direction, digital imaging, guest appearance
Carlos Cabral Jr. — Guest appearance
Adrian G. Gonzalez — Guest appearance
Javier Ramirez — Guest appearance
Johnny Lee Rosas — Guest appearance
Megan Taylor — Intern

Chart performance

Sales and certifications

References 

Intocable albums
2004 live albums
2004 video albums
Live video albums
Grammy Award for Best Mexican/Mexican-American Album